A library and information scientist, also known as a library scholar, is a researcher or academic who specializes in the field of library and information science and often participates in scholarly writing about and related to library and information science. A library and information scientist is neither limited to any one subfield of library and information science nor any one particular type of library. These scientists come from all information-related sectors.

Bibliometric mappings 
Bibliometric methods have been used to create maps of library and information science, thus identifying the most important researchers as well as their relative connections (or distances) and identifying emerging trends related to LIS publications within the field.

White and McCain (1998)  made a map of information science and Åström (2002), Chen, Ibekwe-SanJuan, and Hou (2010), Janssens, Leta, Glanzel, and De Moor (2006), and Zhao and Strotmann (2008) constructed some later maps of library and information science.

Jabeen, Yun, Rafiq, and Jabeen (2015)  mapped the growth and trends of LIS publications.

Notable library and information scientists 

 Sanford Berman
 John Shaw Billings
 Suzanne Briet
 James Duff Brown
 Michael Buckland
 Lois Mai Chan
 Ingetraut Dahlberg
 Melville Dewey
 Douglas John Foskett
 Eugene Garfield
 Michael Gorman
 Allen Kent
 Frederick Kilgour
 David A. Kronick
 Frederick Wilfrid Lancaster

 Kathleen de la Peña McCook
 Alexander Ivanovich Mikhailov
 Herbert Marvin Ohlman 
 Hope A. Olson
 Paul Otlet
 S. R. Ranganathan
 Gerald Salton
 Claire Kelly Schultz
 Jesse Shera
 Elaine Svenonius
 Robert Saxton Taylor
 Barbara Tillett
 Brian Campbell Vickery
 Herbert S. White

See also
 Bibliometrician
 Computer scientist
 Documentalist
 Information scientist
 Librarians
 Library science

References

Further reading 
 Cuadra, C. A. (1964). Identifying key contributions to information science. American Documentation, 15(4), 289–295.
 Feather, J. & Sturges, P. (eds). (1996). International Encyclopedia of Library and Information Science. London & New York: Routledge. 
 Persson, O. (1995). Forskning inom biblioteks- och informationsvetenskap i bibliometrisk belysning. IN: Biblioteken, kulturen och den sociala intelligensen. Aktuell forskning inom biblioteks- och informationsvetenskap. Ed.: Lars Höglund. Göteborg: Valfrid. (pp. 47–56). 
 Persson, O. & Åström, F. (2005).  Most cited universities and authors in Library & Information Science 1990–2004. Bibliometric Notes, 7(2). http://www.umu.se/inforsk/BibliometricNotes/BN2-2005/BN2-2005.htm

External links 
 Index of Information Science pioneers, American Society for Information Science & Technology (1998) 
 Pioneers of Information Science Scrapbook,  Conference on the History and Heritage of Science Information Systems (1998)

 
Information theorists